For the Chilean footballer with the same name see Juan Carlos González (Chilean footballer)

Juan Carlos González Ortiz (22 August 1924 – 15 February 2010) was a Uruguayan footballer. He played for CA Peñarol.

For the Uruguay national football team, he was part of the 1950 FIFA World Cup winning team, and he played in two matches in the tournament.

Gonzalez died on 15 February 2010. He was 85. His remains are buried at the Olympic Mausoleum, Buceo Cemetery.

References

World Cup Champions Squads 1930 – 2002
A primeira grande zebra do Mundial (in Spanish)

External links

1924 births
2010 deaths
Uruguayan footballers
Uruguay international footballers
1950 FIFA World Cup players
FIFA World Cup-winning players
Uruguayan Primera División players
Peñarol players
Burials at Cementerio del Buceo, Montevideo
Association football defenders